Lara Croft: Tomb Raider is a 2001 action adventure film based on the Tomb Raider video game series featuring the character Lara Croft, portrayed by Angelina Jolie. An international co-production between the United States, the United Kingdom, Japan and Germany, it was directed by Simon West and revolves around Lara Croft trying to obtain ancient artifacts in competition with the Illuminati.

The film was released on June 15, 2001, and received generally negative reviews from critics, although Angelina Jolie was praised for her performance. Tomb Raider was the highest-grossing film on its opening weekend. A sequel, Lara Croft: Tomb Raider – The Cradle of Life, was released in 2003.

Plot
Adventurer Lara Croft defeats a robot in an Egyptian tomb, revealed to be a training exercise arena in her family manor, where she lives with her technical assistant Bryce and butler Hillary. In Venice, as the first phase of a planetary alignment begins, the Illuminati search for a key to rejoin halves of a mysterious artifact, "the Triangle," which must be completed by the final phase, a solar eclipse. Manfred Powell assures the cabal that the artifact is almost ready, but has no real idea of its location.

Lara's father Lord Richard Croft, long missing and presumed dead, appears to her in a dream. Lara awakens to a mysterious ticking, and finds a strange clock hidden inside the manor. On her way to consult a friend of her father's, Wilson, Lara crosses paths with Alex West, an American associate and fellow adventurer. Lara shows Wilson the clock, and he puts her in touch with Powell. Lara shows Powell photographs of the clock, which he claims not to recognize.

That night, armed commandos invade the house and steal the clock, bringing it to Powell. The next morning, a prearranged letter from Lara's father arrives, explaining that the clock is the key to retrieving the halves of the Triangle of Light, an ancient object with the power to control time. After misuse of its power destroyed an entire city, the Triangle was separated: one half was hidden in a tomb at Angkor Cambodia, and the other in the ruined city located at Ukok Plateau, Siberia. Her father tasks her to find and destroy both pieces before the Illuminati can exploit the Triangle's power.

In Cambodia, Lara finds Powell, who has hired West, and his commandos already at the temple. West solves part of the temple's puzzle, and Powell prepares to insert the clock at the moment of alignment. Lara, realizing they made a mistake, finds the correct keyhole; with only seconds left, Lara persuades Powell to throw her the clock. She unlocks the first piece of the Triangle, and the statues of the temple come to life and attack the intruders. West, Powell, and his remaining men flee with the clock, leaving Lara to defeat an enormous six-armed guardian statue. She escapes with the first piece; recovering at a Buddhist monastery, she arranges a meeting with Powell.

In Venice, Powell proposes a partnership to find the Triangle, and informs Lara that her father was a member of the Illuminati, and offers to use the Triangle's power to resurrect him; though reluctant, she agrees to join forces. Lara and Bryce travel with Powell, West, and the leader of the Illuminati to Siberia. Entering the tomb, they discover a giant orrery, which activates as the alignment nears completion. Lara retrieves the second half of the Triangle, and Powell kills the Illuminati's leader to restore the Triangle himself, but the halves will not fuse. Realizing Lara knows the solution, Powell kills West to persuade her to complete the Triangle to restore West's and her father's lives. Lara complies, but seizes the Triangle herself.

In a "crossing" of time, Lara faces her father, who urges her to destroy the Triangle for good rather than save his life. Returning to the tomb, Lara manipulates time to save West and stab Powell, and destroys the Triangle. The tomb begins to collapse, and all flee but the wounded Powell, who reveals to Lara that he murdered her father. After a hand-to-hand fight, she kills Powell, retrieving her father's pocket watch and escaping the tomb.

Back in her manor, Lara visits her father's memorial and finds that Bryce has reprogrammed the robot, and Hillary presents her with her pistols, which she takes with a smile.

Cast

 Angelina Jolie as Lara Croft, a British adventurer and archaeologist
 Iain Glen as Manfred Powell, the leader of the Illuminati
 Jon Voight as Lord Richard Croft, Lara's father
 Daniel Craig as Alex West, a former acquaintance of Lara and rival treasure hunter who teams up with Powell just to earn money
 Noah Taylor as Bryce, Lara's tech expert
 Richard Johnson as Distinguished Gentleman
 Chris Barrie as Hillary, Lara's butler
 Julian Rhind-Tutt as Mr. Pimms
 Leslie Phillips as Wilson
 Henry Wyndham as Boothby's Auctioneer
 Olegar Fedoro as Russian Commander

Production

Development
Tomb Raider went through many drafts and several writers, which resulted in production delays. In 1998, writer Brent V. Friedman, who had co-written Mortal Kombat: Annihilation the year before, penned an unproduced Tomb Raider script. Producer and screenwriter Steven E. de Souza, who wrote and directed the 1994 video game film Street Fighter, penned an early draft of the Tomb Raider script in 1999, but it was rejected by Paramount. The final draft of the script was attributed to five writers, including director Simon West. West reverted back to the original writers after he replaced Stephen Herek as director.

Financing
Lara Croft was financed through Tele München Gruppe (TMG), a German tax shelter. The tax law of Germany allowed investors to take an instant tax deduction even on non-German productions and even if the film has not gone into production. By selling them the copyright for $94 million and then buying it back for $83.8 million, Paramount Pictures made $10.2 million. The copyright was then sold again to Lombard Bank, a British investment group and a further $12 million was made. However, to qualify for Section 48 tax relief, the production must include some UK filming and British actors, which was acceptable for a film partially set in the United Kingdom. Presales to distributors in Japan, Britain, France, Germany, Italy and Spain made a further $65 million. Showtime paid $6.8 million for premium cable television rights. In total, $94 million was put together.

Casting
The announcement of the film generated significant discussion about who would be cast to play Lara Croft. Numerous actresses (and non-actresses) were rumoured to be on the shortlist to play her and countless others declared their interest in the role, most notably Jennifer Love Hewitt, Famke Janssen, Jennifer Lopez, Rhona Mitra, Elizabeth Hurley, Ashley Judd, Sandra Bullock, Catherine Zeta-Jones, Diane Lane, Demi Moore and Denise Richards, with many considering the latter the favourite to win the role.

The casting of Jolie was controversial among many fans of the Tomb Raider series, who felt she wasn't physically appropriate enough to play the large-breasted heroine; others complained about an American actress being hired to play a British character; others cited Jolie's tattoos and well-publicised controversial personal life. Director Simon West dismissed these concerns and said, in reference to Jolie's penchant for sexual knife play, "it was always Angelina. I mean, Lara sleeps with knives and doesn't take shit from anybody. That's [Angelina] down to a tee." Jolie wore a padded bra to increase her bust size when playing Lara. As she explained to NY Rock in June 2001: "C'mon, I'm not so flat chested to begin with. When I wear a tight T-shirt, I look a certain way. So it wasn't like we had to completely change me. You know, we just had to enhance me a little. I'm a 36C. Lara, she's a 36D. And in the game, she's a double D, so we took her down some. But we did give her a bit of padding there. For me, it was simply one size. So it was like having a padded bra. But no, I am not flat chested anyway. So we still made it Lara Croft, but we didn't go to any extremes. And Lara doesn't apologize for herself, and for having that, you know, recognizable shape. So I'm not going to apologize for her either."

The film marked the feature film debut of television actor Chris Barrie, known for his role of Arnold Rimmer in the BBC science fiction comedy series Red Dwarf. English actor Daniel Craig adopts an American accent for the role of Alex West whilst Jolie, being American herself, takes on an English accent. Jon Voight, Angelina Jolie's father, plays Richard Croft, Lara's father in the film.

Filming
Principal photography for Lara Croft: Tomb Raider took place from July 30 to November 30, 2000. Portions of the film were shot on location at the Ta Prohm temple, located in Angkor, Siem Reap Province, Cambodia. The film was the first major motion picture to be shot in Cambodia since Lord Jim in 1964, following the country's occupation by the Khmer Rouge regime. In addition to on-location shooting, a majority of the film's production also took place on the 007 Stage at Pinewood Studios. Hatfield House in Hertfordshire was used as Croft's home in the film.

Post-production

Simon West's first director's cut of the film was around 130 minutes long, and that was before it went through re-shoots some time later after principal photography was finished. West was removed from working on the film in post due to some problems between him and Paramount, however he did return to work on re-shoots. Editor Stuart Baird was brought in by Paramount to re-edit the entire film. He was well known for coming in at last minute to help movie studios by fixing up their films which went through troubled productions and had problems with earlier cuts. Baird was promised the job of directing Star Trek: Nemesis by Paramount in exchange for re-editing original 130 minute cut of this film and John Woo's original 210 minute cut of Mission: Impossible 2. Due to all the work on post production taking longer than anyone thought it would, and how rushed it was, some of the major effects were apparently left unfinished by the time the film was released in theaters. Baird ended up re-editing the film down to 88 minutes. One of the bigger cuts on the film was changing the original score. Originally, Nathan McCree was hired to compose the score, since he already composed the music for some of Tomb Raider games, but Paramount insisted on more well known movie composer. Greg Hale Jones started to work on the score with Peter Afterman in November 2000, right after production was finished, and Danny Elfman composed the main theme for the film. Jones later said how once West was fired from the film, his score and Elfman's theme were shelved. Michael Kamen was then hired and he submitted couple demos, although according to Tales From Development Hell by David Hughes, Kamen did in fact compose full score which was rejected once the film was re-edited by Baird. Graeme Revell was then brought in and he had to compose sixty minutes of music inside ten days. Some earlier reports about the film mentioned John Powell as one of original choices for composer, and Fatboy Slim too. Jerry Goldsmith was also attached to score the film at one point, but he couldn't do it due to problems with his health at the time.

Despite large amount of film that was cut out, only four deleted scenes, in total seven minutes long, were included as extras on film's DVD and Blu-Ray releases. Trailers for the film do show at least couple more deleted scenes. At the time of movie's release in July 2001, Simon West said in an interview how he already prepared alternate version of the film for DVD release which would include lot of deleted scenes, but this version was never released. Angelina Jolie's nude scenes were also cut out for PG-13 rating. The shower scene for example originally had actual nude shots of Lara, and next scene where she throws her towel away originally showed some rear nudity from her, however according to Jolie she used body double for her nude shots. One of the special features of the film, Digging Into Tomb Raider, shows filming of another deleted scene where Lara is showering but this one takes place in some outside location. Some of the earlier scripts for the film included more scenes focusing on Lara's sex appeal, like Lara flashing her breasts to some villains as distraction (Steven E. de Souza February 1999 script), using her breasts to crush giant milipede (Mike Werb & Michael Colleary November 1999 script), and many similar scenes (reportedly including her showering, bathing, skinny dipping, losing her bikini while fighting some creature...), but probably due to possible rating problems, this was changed and toned down with each new script. Jolie later said how she was disappointed with how Lara's sexual appeal was scaled down, and how she thought Lara wasn't sexy enough in the final film.

Music

Soundtrack

Lara Croft: Tomb Raider is a 2001 soundtrack album to the film. The various artists soundtrack was released June 15, 2001. The Score was later released on June 25, 2001. The movie also featured the song "Lila" by Vas and a Piano rendition of "Largo" from Johann Sebastian Bach's Harpsichord Concerto no. 5 performed by Hae-won Chang. These were not featured on the soundtrack. Also used in the movie were elements of "Elevation (Influx Remix)" by U2. This was uncredited.

Score

Graeme Revell composed the soundtrack in less than two weeks, following failed attempts by other composers.

The CD was released through Elektra Entertainment. As noted by Revell, the tracks were mislabeled after failed attempts to stop the pressings. For example, the opening track includes both the Main Titles and Lara Croft at Home cues together. The resulting score caused the composer himself to issue an apology "for the poor listening experience" through his website. The track list was later revised.

Release

Home media 
Lara Croft: Tomb Raider was released on DVD and VHS on November 13, 2001; a Blu-ray release followed on June 3, 2008. A 4K UHD Blu-ray release followed on February 27, 2018.

On the North American video rental charts, the film grossed  in DVD rental revenue, . In the United Kingdom, it was watched by  viewers on television in 2004, making it the year's sixth most-watched film (and third most-watched British film) on television.

Reception

Box office 
Tomb Raider was a box office success. The movie debuted at number one with $48.2 million, ahead of Atlantis: The Lost Empire and Shrek, giving Paramount its second-best debut after Mission: Impossible 2 and the fifth-highest debut of 2001. In addition, it had the fourth largest June opening weekend, behind Jurassic Park, Austin Powers: The Spy Who Shagged Me and Batman Forever. It beat the opening record for a film featuring a female protagonist ($42.3 million for Scary Movie) as well as the opening record for a video game adaptation ($31 million for Pokémon: The First Movie), and is one of the highest grossing video game to film adaptations. The movie has grossed a total of $274,703,340 worldwide.

Critical response
The site's consensus is "Angelina Jolie is perfect for the role of Lara Croft, but even she can't save the movie from a senseless plot and action sequences with no emotional impact." On Metacritic it has a weighted average score of 33 out of 100 based on reviews from 31 critics, indicating "generally unfavorable reviews". Audiences surveyed by CinemaScore gave the film a grade B on scale of A to F.

IGN gave the movie the lowest out of all the scores, a 0.0 ("Disaster") rating, condemning everything from character performances to the ending. 
Todd McCarthy of Variety said "[the film] has the distinction of being a major motion picture that’s far less imaginative, and quite a bit more stupid, than the interactive game it’s based on."  McCarthy praises Jolie but says "everything else about this frenetic production is flat and unexciting."
A positive review came from Roger Ebert, who awarded the film three out of four stars and said, Lara Croft Tomb Raider' elevates goofiness to an art form. Here is a movie so monumentally silly, yet so wondrous to look at, that only a churl could find fault."

Accolades
The film was nominated for two MTV Movie Awards, these awards included: Best Female Performance and Best Fight scene, but the film lost to Moulin Rouge! and Rush Hour 2 respectively. The film was also nominated for Teen Choice Award for Choice Movie - Drama. Angelina Jolie was nominated for the Worst Actress Golden Raspberry Award for her role in the film, but she lost to Mariah Carey in Glitter.

Themes
Director Simon West would comment a decade after its release that the creation of Lara Croft was influenced by a film market that "wasn't used to women leading summer blockbusters". This factor influenced his decision to cast Angelina Jolie who was not well known at the time, and not the studio's first choice (in contrast to Catherine Zeta-Jones, Ashley Judd, and Jennifer Lopez). West said that his decision to cast Jolie lay in the fact that "there hadn't been a female lead of an action-adventure film that had carried a film [by herself recently], and Angelina wasn't as big as some of the other actresses that were up for the part, who'd done bigger films and had a longer track record and bigger box-office grosses... Some of their [images] were safer than Angelina's, whose was quite dangerous. She had all sorts of thing written about her—some obviously not true. She was a young woman experimenting." While Lara Crofts box office totals were the highest for a female-led action film at the time, and the film inspired theme park rides and led to a sequel, West stated in 2018 that "at the time, the studio was incredibly nervous at what the outcome could have been. I'm surprised it's taken so long [for other female-fronted action stories to rise up], because I thought that two or three years after, there'd be 10 other movies like it cashing in on its success ...[b]ut it's amazing how things work so slowly. But finally The Hunger Games and Wonder Woman have caught up!"

Other media

Sequel

Angelina Jolie returned in the sequel Lara Croft: Tomb Raider – The Cradle of Life. While it was viewed as a critical improvement over its predecessor, it did not repeat its financial success, grossing $156 million compared to the previous installment's $274 million.

Reboot

GK Films first acquired the rights to reboot the film in 2011. In April 2016, MGM and GK Films announced a reboot of the film starring Alicia Vikander as Lara Croft with Roar Uthaug directing. It was released March 16, 2018.

See also
 List of films based on video games
 List of films featuring eclipses

Notes

References

External links

 
 
 
 

2001 films
2000s action adventure films
2000s fantasy adventure films
American action adventure films
American fantasy adventure films
German action adventure films
British action adventure films
British fantasy adventure films
English-language German films
English-language Japanese films
Live-action films based on video games
Films directed by Simon West
Films produced by Lawrence Gordon
Films scored by Graeme Revell
Films set in Cambodia
Films set in Egypt
Films set in Russia
Films set in Venice
Films shot in Hertfordshire
Films shot at Pinewood Studios
Films shot in Iceland
Girls with guns films
Paramount Pictures films
Mutual Film Company films
Tomb Raider films
Treasure hunt films
Films about the Illuminati
Films with screenplays by Michael Colleary
2000s English-language films
2000s American films
2000s British films
2000s German films
Films shot in Cambodia